Jeremiah Caleb Fraites (born January 17, 1986) is an American musician, composer, songwriter, and multi-instrumentalist.  He is the co-founder of The Lumineers and is a songwriter for the band. He was born and raised in Ramsey, New Jersey.

Early life
Jeremiah Fraites' family is from Ramsey, New Jersey; his mother is the director of the Redeemer Christian Nursery School in Ramsey.  Fraites graduated from Ramsey High School in 2004, and William Paterson University in 2009.

He became an Italian citizen in December 2021.

The Lumineers

Beginnings
Fraites' brother Josh (1982-2001) was a friend of Wesley Schultz; after Josh's death, Jeremiah Fraites and Schultz began playing music together as a way to cope with their shared loss.  After years of playing in the Fraites home, in 2005, they relocated to New York City and began to play in small clubs and at open mic nights in an attempt to find success in the music business.  They played several types of music, and occasionally included other musicians while they played under various names, including Free Beer and Wesley Jeremiah.

Move to Denver
In 2009, Fraites graduated from college.  Unhappy at having to work multiple jobs to make ends meet while attempting to become full-time musicians, Fraites and Schultz decided to relocate to Denver, which had a lower cost of living.  They eventually placed a Craigslist ad for a cello player, which led to Neyla Pekarek joining the band.

Recording contract
A self-financed tour in 2009-2010 led to the band being signed to a management contract.  Their management company financed an EP.  As they became better known, their self-financed tour and their EP led to The Lumineers being signed to a recording contract.  The band subsequently released the albums The Lumineers (2012) and Cleopatra (2016).

Solo work
Fraites released his solo debut album Piano Piano on January 22, 2021, through Dualtone Records (US/Canada) and Mercury KX (World). The album is a collection of piano-centric instrumental songs that he had been working on for over a decade. It was met with critical acclaim from NPR's Weekend Edition, Denver Post, NPR Music's All Songs Considered, American Songwriter, and Earmilk among others.

Fraites partnered with the meditation app Calm for the release of two exclusive tracks titled "Felt" and "Pluck."

He also partnered with the British music technology company Spitfire Audio for their Originals series on a program called "Firewood Piano." The program is based on his eccentric upright piano, nicknamed "Firewood," on which he used to record several songs for his solo debut album.

Songwriting credits

References

Sources

Newspapers

Magazines

Internet

Living people
1986 births
People from Ramsey, New Jersey
American folk rock musicians
Ramsey High School (New Jersey) alumni
Songwriters from New Jersey
William Paterson University alumni
The Lumineers members